(born in 1965) is a Japanese character designer and animation director. His most known works include RahXephon, Fullmetal Alchemist Brotherhood, and Bungo Stray Dogs.

References

External links 

 Hiroki Kanno anime at Media Arts Database 

Japanese animators
Japanese animated film directors
Living people
1965 births
Place of birth missing (living people)